Warren Township is one of 12 townships in Huntington County, Indiana, United States. As of the 2020 census, its population was 641.

History
Warren Township was organized in 1843.

Geography

Unincorporated towns
 Bippus
 Bracken
 Luther
 Makin

Adjacent townships
 Cleveland Township, Whitley County (north)
 Washington Township, Whitley County (northeast)
 Clear Creek Township (east)
 Huntington Township (southeast)
 Dallas Township (south)
 Lagro Township, Wabash County (southwest)
 Chester Township, Wabash County (west)

Cemeteries
The township contains two cemeteries: Funk and Saint Johns.

Major highways
  Indiana State Road 5
  Indiana State Road 16
  Indiana State Road 105
  Indiana State Road 113
  Indiana State Road 114

Notable person
 Chris Schenkel, Emmy Award winning sportscaster

Demographics

References
 U.S. Board on Geographic Names (GNIS)
 United States Census Bureau cartographic boundary files

External links
 Indiana Township Association
 United Township Association of Indiana

Townships in Huntington County, Indiana
Townships in Indiana